Megalodacne is a genus of fungivorous beetles in the family Erotylidae.

Description

Distinguishing characteristics of the genus along with other members of the subfamily Megalodacninae include large eyes and a lack of depressions in the club joint of the antennae. The first three tarsomeres are also cylindrical and of similar shape and size, while the fourth is significantly shorter.

Species of the genus Megalodacne very closely resembles members of the genera Episcapha and Episcaphula (some members of which were formerly classified under Megalodacne). They also often look superficially similar to several other beetles since the patterns of the markings of yellow, orange, or red on the elytra (called fascia) of Megalodacne are shared by many other beetle species.

An example of which is the sap beetle (Nitidulidae) genus Glischrochilus. Their native ranges sometimes overlap as well, making it easy to confuse the two (as with Megalodacne fasciatus, Megalodacne heros, and the nitulidid Glischrochilus fasciatus from eastern North America). Glischrochilus reaches a maximum length of only . The elytra of the sap beetles which most resemble Megalodacne also do not cover the whole abdomen and leave the last abdominal segment(s) exposed. The elytra of Megalodacne, on the other hand, completely cover the abdomen.

Ecology
Megalodacne species feed on harder bracket fungi than smaller members of the family. The fungi eaten include Ganoderma and Fomes species.

Some tropical nocturnal species of Megalodacne are attracted to light.

Life cycle
Megalodacne deposit eggs on the fungi on which they feed. Upon hatching, the larvae, like adults, also feed on the fruiting bodies of bracket fungi by burrowing into it.

There are two kinds of larvae of Megalodacne depending on the species. In some species, the larvae are elongated and feed on fungi by drilling holes inside of it. In others, the larvae feed alongside adults by gnawing out shallow depressions on the fruiting bodies of fungi. The latter larvae are sluggish, heavily sclerotized, and somewhat flattened. The larval stage takes about 2 to 3 months from egg to pupation. It is not uncommon to see adults feeding along with larvae.

Taxonomy and systematics
Megalodacne was first described by George Robert Crotch in 1873. The type species is Megalodacne fasciata. The genus Megalodacne is classified in the subfamily Megalodacninae, alongside the genera Episcapha and Episcaphula.

List of species
Species of Megalodacne include:
Megalodacne bellula (Lewis, 1883) – Japan, Korea, & China
Megalodacne chinensis (Crotch, 1876) – China
Megalodacne elongatula (Crotch, 1876) – Southeast Asia
Megalodacne fasciata (Fabricius, 1777) – eastern North America
Megalodacne grandipennis (Fairmaire, 1891) – Tanzania
Megalodacne grandis (Fabricius, 1792) - Africa
Megalodacne heros (Say, 1823) – eastern North America
Megalodacne immaculata (Chûjô and Kiuchi, 1963) – Japan
Megalodacne marginata (Arrow, 1925) – Assam
Megalodacne promensis (Arrow, 1925) – Burma, China
Megalodacne similima (Crotch, 1876) – Sarawak, Sumatra
Megalodacne varia (Gorham, 1889) – Malaysia

References

External links

Erotylidae
Cucujoidea genera